Nothing Is Wasted may refer to:

Nothing Is Wasted (album), a 2013 album by Christian band Elevation Worship
Nothing Is Wasted EP, a 2013 EP by Christian singer Jason Gray
"Nothing Is Wasted" (song), the title song from the EP